Juan Columbié Sanamé (born 24 January 1995) is a Cuban weightlifter. He is a four-time medalist, including gold, at the Pan American Weightlifting Championships. He is also a two-time silver medalist at the Central American and Caribbean Games.

Career 

He won the bronze medal in the men's 105kg event at the 2017 Pan American Weightlifting Championships held in Miami, United States. He finished in 5th place in his event at the 2018 Pan American Weightlifting Championships held in Santo Domingo, Dominican Republic.

In 2019, he won the bronze medal in the men's 109kg event at the Pan American Weightlifting Championships held in Guatemala City, Guatemala. In that same year, he competed in the men's 109kg event at the Pan American Games held in Lima, Peru. He won the gold medal in the men's 109kg event at the 2020 Pan American Weightlifting Championships held in Santo Domingo, Dominican Republic.

He won the bronze medal in the men's 109kg event at the 2022 Pan American Weightlifting Championships held in Bogotá, Colombia. He won the gold medal in the Snatch event with a lift of 168 kg.

Achievements

References

External links 
 

Living people
1995 births
Cuban male weightlifters
Pan American Weightlifting Championships medalists
Competitors at the 2018 Central American and Caribbean Games
Central American and Caribbean Games medalists in weightlifting
Central American and Caribbean Games silver medalists for Cuba
Weightlifters at the 2019 Pan American Games
Pan American Games competitors for Cuba
21st-century Cuban people